Godfrey Keppel Papillon (24 September 1867 – 14 August 1942) was an English cricketer. Papillon was a right-handed batsman.

The son of Philip Oxendon Papillon and Emily Caroline Garnier, Papillon was born at Lexden Manor at Lexden, Essex. Papillon appeared once in first-class cricket when he was selected to represent the Gentlemen in the Gentlemen v Players fixture of 1892 at the Central Recreation Ground, Hastings. In a match which ended as a draw, Papillon batted once in the Gentlemen's first-innings, scoring 10 runs before he was dismissed by William Attewell. He later played minor counties cricket for Northamptonshire, debuting for the county in the 1901 Minor Counties Championship against Hertfordshire. He played minor counties cricket for Northamptonshire until 1903, making twenty further appearances in the Minor Counties Championship.

He married Jessie Winifred Wilson Paton in 1899. He died at Hexham, Northumberland on 14 August 1942. Several of his relatives were also first-class cricketers.

References

External links
Godfrey Papillon at ESPNcricinfo
Godfrey Papillon at CricketArchive

1867 births
1942 deaths
Sportspeople from Colchester
English cricketers
Northamptonshire cricketers
Gentlemen cricketers